Yegor Alexeyevich Korshkov (born 10 July 1996) is a Russian professional ice hockey forward who is currently playing for Lokomotiv Yaroslavl in the Kontinental Hockey League (KHL). His rights are held by the Florida Panthers of the National Hockey League (NHL).

Playing career
Korshkov made his Kontinental Hockey League debut playing with Lokomotiv Yaroslavl during the 2014–15 KHL season.

In the 2016 NHL Entry Draft Korshkov was chosen 31st overall by the Toronto Maple Leafs, the highest the team had ever selected a Russian player. Korshkov was scouted out by Evgeny Namestnikov, the same scout who tipped the Leafs off on Nikita Soshnikov a year earlier.

In the 2018–19 season, Korshkov recorded 3 goals and 5 points thorough 19 games before collecting 3 assists in 9 playoff games. On 1 May 2019, Korshkov signed a two-year, entry-level contract with the Maple Leafs, immediately joining AHL affiliate the Toronto Marlies, in the midst of their playoff run.

During the 2019–20 season, Korshkov continued in the AHL with the Marlies before he was recalled by the Maple Leafs to make his NHL debut, and subsequently scored his first NHL goal on 16 February 2020 in a game against the Buffalo Sabres.

On 15 February 2021, Korshkov rights were traded along with David Warsofsky to the Carolina Hurricanes in exchange for Alex Galchenyuk. Following the completion of the 2021–22 season with Lokomotiv, suffering a first-round defeat in the playoffs to CSKA Moscow, Korshokv's NHL rights were again traded, dealt by the Hurricanes in a three-team trade to the Florida Panthers on 21 March 2022.

Career statistics

Regular season and playoffs

International

References

External links
 
 

1996 births
Living people
Lokomotiv Yaroslavl players
Russian ice hockey right wingers
Sportspeople from Novosibirsk
Toronto Maple Leafs draft picks
Toronto Maple Leafs players
Toronto Marlies players